Ivahn Marie-Josée (born November 4, 1978) is a Mauritian football player who currently plays for AS de Vacoas-Phoenix in the Mauritian Premier League and for the Mauritius national football team as a goalkeeper. He is featured on the Mauritian national team in the official 2010 FIFA World Cup video game.

References 

1978 births
Living people
Mauritius international footballers
Mauritian footballers
Association football goalkeepers